Martin Smith is an American sports journalist, best known for his work with ESPN. Smith was hired by the network in 2006 for NASCAR coverage. He hosted an interview show titled SportsCenter Presents: Marty Smith’s America.
He is also known as the Blue Ridge Auto Group guy.

Early life 
Marty Smith is a native of Pearisburg, Virginia. He attended Giles High School, where he was a member of the school's 1993 state champion football team. Smith later attended Radford University.

After one year at Carson–Newman University, Smith transferred to Radford University and tried out for the Highlanders baseball team as a walk-on but was cut. He stayed at the school and graduated in 1998. He met his wife, Lainie, while at Radford.

Career 

Smith started his career with ESPN in 2006 as a NASCAR reporter. In addition to coverage for SportsCenter, he also appeared on NASCAR Countdown and NASCAR Now.

In 2017, Smith hosted SportsCenter Presents: Marty Smith’s America, where he interviewed athletes such as Tim Tebow, Cristiano Ronaldo, and Cam Newton. In addition to appearances on SportsCenter and other ESPN shows, Smith hosts the Marty Smith's America podcast.

Smith co-hosts the Marty & McGee podcast alongside Ryan McGee. In 2015 the podcast was promoted to a regular weekend time slot on ESPN Radio and in 2018 a TV version of the show began on the SEC Network.

Smith covered Euro 2016 for ESPN including flying out to Iceland.

References

External links

1976 births
Living people
ESPN people
Journalists from Virginia
Radford University alumni
People from Pearisburg, Virginia